M-100s, are a class of powerful firecrackers commonly called salutes. They are also known as silver salutes.

Description
They contain approximately 9 grams of pyrotechnic flash powder that is ignited via a visco fuse positioned in either the center or on one of the ends of the tube.

In the United States, M-100s are illegal to manufacture, possess, and sell without a proper license, and are regulated by the Bureau of Alcohol, Tobacco, Firearms, and Explosives (ATF). M-100s were first banned by the Child Protection Act of 1966.

Accidents
In 1983, an explosion at a secret unlicensed fireworks factory manufacturing M-80 and M-100 fireworks near Benton, Tennessee, killed eleven, injured one, and inflicted damage within a radius of several miles.

See also
M-80 (explosive)
Quarter stick

References

Types of fireworks